Sister Maria Celeste (born Virginia Gamba; 16 August 1600 – 2 April 1634) was an Italian nun. She was the daughter of the scientist Galileo Galilei and Marina Gamba.

Biography 
Virginia was the eldest of three siblings, with a sister Livia and a brother Vincenzio. All three were born out of wedlock, and the daughters were considered unworthy for marriage. Troubled by monetary problems, Galileo placed them in the San Matteo convent shortly after Virginia's thirteenth birthday. When she took the veil in 1616, Virginia chose her religious name, Maria Celeste, in honour of the Virgin Mary and her father's love of astronomy.

From her cloister, Maria Celeste was a source of support not only for her Poor Clares sisters, but also for her father. Maria Celeste served as San Matteo's apothecary (herself being of frail health). She sent her father herbal treatments for his maladies while additionally managing the convent's finances and staging plays inside the convent. There is evidence she prepared the manuscripts for some of Galileo's books. Maria Celeste was also a mediator between her father and her brother.

Maria Celeste frequently asked her father for help for the convent, and kept it afloat through his influence. Galileo helped repair its windows and made sure its clock was in order. 

In 1633, the Inquisition tried Galileo for heresy. He was forced to recant his views on heliocentrism, and was sentenced to house arrest for life. Shortly after Galileo returned to Arcetri in disgrace, Maria Celeste contracted dysentery and died on 2 April 1634, aged 33.

Galileo described Maria Celeste as "a woman of exquisite mind, singular goodness, and most tenderly attached to me".

Work 
After Galileo's death, 124 letters from Maria Celeste written between 1623 and 1633 were discovered among his papers. Galileo's responses have been lost. Maria Celeste's letters have been published:

  Virginia Galilei, Lettere al padre on Wikisource
  Galilei, Maria Celeste, and Sobel, Dava. Letters to Father: Suor Maria Celeste to Galileo, 1623-1633. New York: Walker & Co., 2001 Also online

Legacy 
 Maria Celeste appears as a character in the play Life of Galileo, by Bertold Brecht and Margarete Steffin. The play does not give an accurate portrayal of her life as it depicts her becoming engaged, rather than as a nun.
 The International Astronomical Union has named the impact crater Maria Celeste on the planet Venus after her.

Notes and references 
  Favaro, Antonio. , Florence: G. Barbèra, 1891
 Sobel, Dava. Galileo's Daughter: A Historical Memoir of Science, Faith and Love, Penguin Group, 1999,  . Numerous formats and translations. 
 Galileo Project

External links

1600 births
1634 deaths
17th-century Italian Roman Catholic religious sisters and nuns
Galilei family